

History

Grand Terrace

After Risley Hall was designed as a women's residence hall in 1911, work began on the construction of a men's residence hall complex on West Campus. In 1910, Warren Hanning's campus plan had established the site for new halls in the English collegiate gothic style. Trustees George Charles Boldt, Andrew Dickson White, and Robert H. Treman led a subscription campaign. The site was designed by architect Ralph Adams Cram, who had recently completed the Graduate School at Princeton University. Architectural firm Day & Klauder designed multiple buildings, each housing between 16 and 30 men. Founders Hall was built in 1914 and South Baker Hall was built in 1915.

In the 1920s, West Campus was envisioned as fully Gothic in style, connected to Frederick Law Olmsted's plan of a grand terrace overlooking Lake Cayuga. Rhode Island architect F. Ellis Jackson, class of 1900, expanded this plan to include a memorial to the 264 Cornellians who had died in the First World War. The World War I Memorial group has twin Army and Navy towers with Lyon Hall to the north and McFaddin Hall to the south, both built in 1928. Mennen Hall was built in 1931. Names of those who served are inscribed on plaques between unglazed tracery windows in the cloister. Over the windows are names of battles in which they fought. The names of individual and group donors toward the construction of the halls are inscribed in the tower rooms, Lyon Hall, and over the buildings' entries. The first floor of the War Memorial includes an elaborately decorated octagonal memorial room to the war dead, including a painting by Alison Mason Kingsbury. The upper two floors were designed as the meeting rooms and apartments for the Quill and Dagger honorary society.

Although portions of West Campus were built in the Gothic style, the grand terrace plan was ultimately scrapped. Six dormitories were built in 1953 to accommodate the post-World War II expansion in enrollment. These six brick dormitories were called the "University Halls" to distinguish them from the gothic "Baker Dormitories." In the 1960s -1980's, five of the individual University Halls were named in honor of various alumni classes that had achieved large donation records. The original Noyes Community Center, which offered dining, recreation and other services to residents of the campus, was constructed in 1966.

Before funding was obtained for either the new North Campus dormitories or the West campus replacement dormitories, Sheldon Court and Sage Infirmary (now Schuyler House) were converted into dormitories in 1981, and Cascadilla Hall was later renovated.

West Campus Initiative
Cornell had been considering establishing a series of residential colleges since a campus committee chaired by Alain Seznec recommended them in 1969. Although a residential college was established in Risley Hall in 1970, a lack of funding delayed more widespread implementation. In 1999, then-Cornell president Hunter R. Rawlings III announced a new West Campus Initiative to rebuild large parts of West Campus. With an initial $100 million donation, the project aimed to create a residential college system on West Campus. Furthermore, a new Noyes Recreational Community Center was also proposed to replace the original community center. The project was completed in August 2008.

Residences

House system

As part of the Residential Initiative, the house system aims to create smaller communities enhanced by a relaxed atmosphere to supplement students' academic pursuits. Each residential college is housed in a newly built main building, and three colleges include surrounding Gothic-styled buildings. Within each main building, each college has its own dining hall. Rooms are divided into hallway-style arrangements and suite-style arrangements. All residents must enroll in the House Choice meal plan, which allows them unlimited meals in West Campus dining halls, but limits the number of meals they may take elsewhere. This is similar to the Risley meal plan which has been in effect since 1971. The rooms are singles or doubles arranged in suites and apartments. The facilities include laundry, kitchens, computer networking, study lounges, and TV/social lounges. Some annual events include drive-in movies on the Tower, Fall trips to hike the gorges, sea kayaking on Cayuga Lake, go-karting, a Winter Semi-formal, a Mardi Gras celebration, trips to the Late Show with David Letterman and an end of the year barbecue.

The house system comprises:
 Alice Cook House, founded in 2004. It is named in honor of School of Industrial and Labor Relations labor historian and University Ombudsman Alice H. Cook (1903–1998).
 Carl Becker House, founded in 2005. It is named in honor of historian Carl L. Becker (1873–1945).
 Hans Bethe House was completed in January 2007. It is named in honor of the Nobel Prize-winning Cornell physicist Hans Bethe (1906–2005).
 William T. Keeton House  was completed in August 2008. It is named in honor of esteemed Cornell biology professor William T. Keeton (1933–1980).
 Flora Rose House was completed in August 2008. It is named after Flora Rose (1874–1959), co-founder of the College of Human Ecology.

Baker Dormitories

Known as the Baker Dormitories or recently called The Gothic Halls, these are nine residence halls on West Campus recognizable by their ivy-covered stone walls of local bluestone trimmed in Indiana limestone, reflecting the late Gothic architectural style of Oxford and Cambridge. All nine were named the Baker Dormitories in honor of George Fisher Baker, a New York City banker. They housed both freshmen and upperclass males through the 1970s. Women were also housed in some sections of the Baker dormitories beginning in the early 1970s.

All of the Baker dormitories became affiliated with house communities. Boldt Tower, Boldt Hall, Baker Tower, and North Baker Hall (Language House) are now part of Alice Cook House. McFaddin Hall is now part of Hans Bethe House. The others, South Baker Hall, Founders Hall, Mennen Hall, and Lyon Hall, are now part of Flora Rose House.

The halls are currently coeducational except for Lyon Hall (women only), but they are all open only to upperclassmen. Lyon Hall also houses the permanent sanctuary of the Quill and Dagger senior honor society and a war memorial shrine.

Class Halls

Known as the University Halls or U-Halls, the Class Halls were originally all-male dormitories built on West Campus in 1953. They were designed by Chapman, Evans & Delehanty and Quinlivan, Pierik & Krause. Although officially denied by Cornell, some claim that when constructed, they were intended to be temporary housing (as evidenced, for example, by the transitory fiberglass showers) until better structures could be built. The six halls were later named for Elmer Sperry (inventor of the gyroscope) and the Cornell graduating classes of 1917, 1918, 1922, 1926, and 1928.

In 1987, these buildings were gutted and the original aluminum-framed windows replaced with dark-brown metal casings. More study spaces and kitchens were added, and the capacity of each University Hall was reduced.

In 1885, Andrew Dickson White's final presidential report warned the University of the day when "all be hard and dry, [the University]'s buildings mere boxes." Such a description is apt to describe the Class Halls. All were built in a similar box-like fashion, lacking individualizing characteristics and architectural complexity. The interiors were indistinguishable from each other, as well. Although not as clear with the addition of the Noyes Community Center, the Class Halls formed a quadrangle arranged symmetrically along an axis formed by the War Memorial. The Transfer Center, one of two West Campus Program Houses, resided in the Class of 1917 Hall. This Program House, established in 1977, was dissolved in May 2007 when the building was torn down. Between 2003 and 2007, the halls were demolished in favor of larger residential colleges as part of former president Hunter R. Rawlings III's "West Campus Housing Initiative." For many years, Sperry Hall (University Hall #6) was also a Program House. The Class of 1926 Hall housed the Just About Music (JAM) Program House.

By 2007, all of the Class Halls had been demolished.

Housing selection process

Whereas freshmen are guaranteed housing on North Campus, upperclassmen housing is more complex. Sophomores are guaranteed housing, but seniors and juniors are not. A lottery system is used to randomly allow students who apply to select their residences for the following year. For the residential college dormitories, an in-house lottery of current upperclassmen is used to allocate a fixed number of rooms for rising juniors and seniors. Next, the remaining rooms are applied for. The number of senior and junior slots in this pool are determined by the total number of open rooms on West Campus, minus the number of sophomores who applied for West Campus housing. Then, in order of sophomore to senior, the applicants are allowed to select their rooms for the next academic year. Furthermore, students are allowed to block, so that up to five applicants may select adjacent rooms at the same time. A special requirement for blocks of three or more participants is that one person must be assigned a bed in a double or a triple room.

Revisions to the Flora Rose Housing system were implemented starting in the 2013-2014 academic year to keep the most active, interested residents of Rose House in the system. The lottery system was abolished in Rose House and replaced with two programs: the Rose Scholars program and the Rose Community Organizers program. The larger Rose Scholars program requires residents to attend events hosted within and approved by the House on a weekly basis. The Rose Community Organizers, the smaller program, requires residents to attend the weekly Rose Roundtable meetings and organize events for the House and West Campus. Completion of either event guarantees residents housing within Rose House for the following year. Residents must apply and be accepted into the program in the early fall to participate. Emphasis in the application process is on essays.

Small living units

West Campus includes a number of other student residential structures, including those organized under the Cornell University Residence Plan of 1966, among the following:

University-owned
 112 Edgemoor Lane (upperclassman dormitory; originally Sigma Phi Epsilon fraternity, later Triangle Fraternity)
 625 University Ave (Alice Cook House annex); formerly Alpha Tau Omega fraternity
 660 Stewart (Cooperative), 660 Stewart Ave
 Chi Phi ("Craigielea," fraternity), 107 Edgemoor Ln
 Delta Kappa Epsilon ("Deke House," fraternity), 13 South Ave
 Delta Tau Delta (fraternity), 104 Mary Anne Wood Dr
 Delta Upsilon (fraternity), 6 South Ave
 Kappa Alpha Theta (sorority), 519 Stewart Ave
 Phi Gamma Delta ("The Oaks," fraternity), 118 McGraw Pl
 Phi Kappa Psi (fraternity), 525 Stewart Avenue, deliveries to 120 Mary Ann Wood Drive, also known as the Irving Literary Society
 Phi Sigma Sigma (sorority), 14 South Ave (originally Kappa Alpha Society)
 Psi Upsilon (fraternity), 2 Forest Park Ln
 Sigma Alpha Mu ("Hillcrest," fraternity), 101 McGraw Pl
 Sigma Phi (fraternity), 1 Forest Park Ln
 Sigma Phi Epsilon (fraternity), 109 McGraw Pl
 Von Cramm Hall (cooperative), 623 University Ave
 Watermargin (cooperative), 103 McGraw Pl

West Campus is a residential section of Cornell University's Ithaca, New York campus located west of Libe Slope and between the Fall Creek gorge and the Cascadilla gorge. It now primarily houses transfer students, second year students, and upperclassmen.

Private
 104 West (formerly Kosher Dining Hall; owned by Center for Jewish Living, operated by Cornell Dining), 104 West Ave
 Algonquin Lodge (cooperative), 526 Stewart Ave
 Alpha Delta Phi (fraternity), 777 Stewart Ave
 Alpha Sigma Phi ("Rockledge," fraternity), 804 Stewart Ave
 Cayuga Lodge (cooperative), 630 Stewart Ave
 Center for Jewish Living (formerly Young Israel at Cornell), 106 West Ave
 Chi Psi (fraternity), 810 University Ave
 Delta Phi ("Llenroc," Ezra Cornell's mansion, fraternity), 100 Cornell Ave
 Lambda Chi Alpha ("Edgemoor," fraternity), 125 Edgemoor Ln
 Omega Tau Sigma (fraternity), 200 Willard Wy
 Phi Sigma Kappa (fraternity), 702 University Ave
 Pi Kappa Alpha (fraternity), 17 South Ave
 Sigma Nu (fraternity), 230 Willard Wy
 Sigma Pi (fraternity), 730 University Ave
 Stewart Little (Cooperative), 211 Stewart Ave
 Telluride House (scholarship residence), 217 West Ave
 Theta Delta Chi (fraternity), 800 University Ave

Former
 110 Edgemoor Ln, demolished (formerly Delta Tau Delta fraternity)
 102 West Ave, demolished (originally Seal and Serpent fraternity)
 722 University Ave., demolished (formerly Pi Kappa Phi fraternity, later Alpha Chi Rho and Lambda Upsilon Lambda fraternities and Alpha Gamma Delta sorority)

Other buildings

West Campus was served by the Noyes Community Center (formerly the Noyes Student Union) located on Stewart Avenue, centered on the axis of the War Memorial, until the 2006-07 academic year. This building was demolished and in 2007 was replaced with the Noyes Community Recreation Center, which provides indoor athletic facilities located on Campus Road.

Academic buildings include: the Treman House (1902) designed by William Henry Miller, which houses the George McT. Kahin Center for Advanced Research on Southeast Asia.

Parking
Insufficient parking on West Campus has been the source of controversy and litigation. Alice Cook House was built on the main West Campus parking lot. The University sought to replace the lost parking spaces by paving over the Redbud Woods, located on the gardens of the Treman estate. Conservation advocates sought to protect the area as a Historic District, and advocated the construction of underground parking beneath the new West Campus houses. Nonetheless, after much litigation and protests, the University paved the woods as a dormitory parking lot.

References

External links
 West Campus Residential Initiative Alumni Webpage
 Announcement of West Campus Initiative

Cornell University buildings
Cornell University campuses
Cornell University dormitories